Mimasyngenes venezuelensis is a species of beetle in the family Cerambycidae. It was described by Breuning in 1956. It is known from Venezuela (from which its species epithet).

References

Desmiphorini
Beetles described in 1956